Jane Holland (born 17 November 1966 in Ilford, London) is an English poet, novelist and astrologer. She won an Eric Gregory Award from the Society of Authors for her poetry in 1996 and her YA novel Witchstruck, written as Victoria Lamb, won the Romantic Novelists' Association's Young Adult Romantic Novel of the Year Award for 2013. Her sister is the novelist, actress and singer Sarah Holland. She also writes commercial fiction under various pseudonyms, including Betty Walker, JJ Holland, Victoria Lamb, Elizabeth Moss, Beth Good and Hannah Coates.

Biography
Jane Holland was born on 17 November 1966 in Ilford, London, England, the daughter of the romantic novelist Sheila Ann Mary Coates Holland (Charlotte Lamb) and classical biographer and ex-Times journalist Richard Holland. She moved with her parents to the Isle of Man in 1977, where she lived for 23 years. She has four siblings: the novelist, actress and singer Sarah Holland, Charlotte, Michael and David. She was a snooker player on the WLBSA Women's World Snooker circuit for six years from 1989 to 1995, under her married name Jane Moss and later Jane Holland, and was seeded 24 in the 1994 Women's World Snooker Championship. 

After leaving snooker, Holland edited the small poetry magazine Blade from 1995 to 1999, and published her first full-length collection of poetry in 1997, The Brief History of a Disreputable Woman, with Bloodaxe Books, followed in 1999 by a first novel, Kissing the Pink, with Sceptre, both these works being inspired by the fall-out following her departure from snooker.    She was also one of five young Bloodaxe poets who performed on the New Blood UK Tour of 1997, the others being Roddy Lumsden, Julia Copus, Tracey Herd and Eleanor Brown.

Holland was the Warwick Poet Laureate for 2008. She founded the Poets On Fire website and forum, and was a prominent member of the Birmingham-based performance poetry and spoken-word group New October Poets in 2006, when she was named one of the top poetry performers in the West Midlands under the "Six of the Best" scheme. She edited the online arts magazine Horizon Review (Salt Publishing) from 2008 to 2010 and was a commissioning editor at Embrace Books from 2010 to 2011.

Holland's first collection was in a mainstream British tradition, generally as a "nature" poet rather than an urban stylist, citing Ted Hughes as a major early influence. Recent work includes a long narrative poem sequence written in the voice of Boudicca and a translation of the Anglo-Saxon poem, "The Wanderer".

Boudicca & Co. was published by Salt Publishing in 2006. Camper Van Blues was published by Salt in 2008. Two poetry pamphlets were also published in 2008: The Lament of the Wanderer [Heaventree Press], a new translation of the eponymous Anglo-Saxon poem, and On Warwick (Nine Arches Press), a collection of poems written during her year as Warwick Poet Laureate, including the long experimental poem On Warwick Castle.

Now a full-time fiction writer, she has written numerous bestselling thrillers as Jane Holland, including her most popular novel to date, Girl Number One [Thomas & Mercer], which was a UK Kindle #1 Bestseller in December 2015, as well as a string of romances, historicals and contemporary novels variously under the pseudonyms Betty Walker, JJ Holland, Beth Good, Victoria Lamb, Elizabeth Moss, and others.

Works

Poetry

Fiction

References

External links
Jane Holland
Recordings of Jane Holland's poetry
Poets On Fire – live and performance UK poetry
Boudicca & Co. at Salt Publishing
Account of her years as a snooker champion
Literary agent's author page as Betty Walker
Literary agent's author page as Jane Holland
The Bookseller: Lume Books Acquires Latest Jane Holland Thriller
The Bookseller: Transworld acquires three novels from Jane Holland (writing as Victoria Lamb)
Snooker Zone: Jane Holland author and player

English women poets
1966 births
Living people
English women novelists
English romantic fiction writers